Waverley Steps is a stair link of unique character linking Princes Street to Waverley station, an essential pedestrian route in the centre of Edinburgh.

History

The staircase was opened in 1902 as part of the adjacent development of the North British Hotel, which at that time belonged to the North British Railway Company together with its flagship station, Waverley station.

The dramatic flight of steps are flanked by original 1902 shops on the east and Waverley Market on the west. Waverley Market was originally a curious Victorian multi-level structure occupying an awkward stone quarry on the edge of Princes Street. The original market was demolished in 1974 having become structurally unstable, and redeveloped a decade later as a multi-level underground shopping mall. It has been remodelled several times thereafter in an effort to increase its popularity, but with very limited success.

In 2010 Network Rail removed the original staircase, in order to add both an escalator and lift (to the south), and critically covering this external area with a glass canopy. The new system opened in 2012. This was primarily to address disabled access requirements. From 2012 the steps have been secured at the north end (onto Princes Street) if the railway station is closed.

BFI film

The BFI 30 minute documentary "Waverley Steps (A Visit to Edinburgh)" was made in 1948 directed by John Eldridge and created by Greenpark Productions. Stylistically in borrows on the German expressionism of the 1920s.

It "stars" N K Stroyberg, a Dane living in Edinburgh, who plays a Danish sailor arriving in Leith Docks who explores the city for a day.

The storyline covers a Sunday in Edinburgh. We initially see the Flying Scotsman travelling fast: the train then changes to the "Merlin" (no.27), arriving in the afternoon, and the railway fireman getting off at Dalry, and returning to his young wife in a tenement on the north side of Calton Road via Kings Stables Road.

We see inside and outside several buildings: St Cuthbert's, St Giles Cathedral and Dundas House. There is also a glimpse inside the blacksmith's workshop on Coalhill in Leith (demolished 1991).

The film contains documentary footage of the original Edinburgh Trams on Leith Walk (closed 7 years later) and many streets: Princes Street, Ramsay Gardens, Leith Walk, Commercial Street, Moray Place, George IV Bridge, Jeffrey Street, and Calton Road.

References

External links
 

Streets in Edinburgh